Mayapa–Canlubang Cadre Road, also known as Mayapa Road, is a two- to four-lane, tertiary national road, located in Calamba, Laguna in the Philippines. It spans  stretching from the "Checkpoint" area at the intersection with Manila South Road in barangay Paciano Rizal to Jose Yulo Sr. Avenue and Silangan Industrial Park Road (Doña Cecila Yulo Avenue) in barangay Canlubang. This road adjoins the Canlubang Exit of South Luzon Expressway.

In 2015, the road was reclassified from barangay road to tertiary national road.

Landmarks

References 

Roads in Laguna (province)